Kianna is a given name. Notable people with the name include:

Kianna Alarid (born 1978), American musician
Kianna Smith (born 1999), American basketball player
Kim Kianna Dy (born 1995), Filipino volleyball player

See also
Khanna (name)
Kiana (disambiguation)

Feminine given names